Douglas Muir (17 March 1925 – 6 September 2014) was a Scotland international rugby union player who played for Heriots at amateur level and Edinburgh District at provincial level.

Rugby career

Amateur career

He played for Heriots

Provincial career

Muir represented Edinburgh District. He was in the winning side that won the 1949-50 Inter-City against Glasgow District. He also played in the next two Inter-City matches, but was on the losing side in both. Although Edinburgh won the first Scottish Inter-District Championship in 1953-54 Muir did not feature in the tournament. He did play in the 1954–55 Scottish Inter-District Championship however Edinburgh finished third that season.

International career

He was capped for  seven times between 1950–52, making his debut against France.

He also played for the Barbarians.

Scotland selector

On  Muir's retirement in business he was to become a Scotland selector.

Outside of rugby

Army

Muir served with the Gurkas in the second world war.

Business

Muir joined Edinburgh based printing and packaging firm William Thyne & Co. as a management trainee and rose to become the Managing Director. When Thyne was taken over by Mardon Packaging, he moved to Bristol as divisional chairman.

Family

His wife Isla died in 2011. Muir died in Essex while visiting his son. His normal residence was in Guernsey, where he stayed with his daughter.

His funeral took place in Guernsey.

References

1925 births
2014 deaths
Scottish rugby union players
Scotland international rugby union players
Rugby union locks
Heriot's RC players
Edinburgh District (rugby union) players
Barbarian F.C. players
Rugby union players from Edinburgh